Elections to Stevenage Borough Council took place on 6 May 2021. This was on the same day as other local elections across the United Kingdom. One third of the council was up for election, plus a by-election in Roebuck ward; the seats which were last contested in 2016. The Labour Party retained control of the council, which it has held continuously since 1973, but with a reduced majority.

Results summary

Ward results

Bandley Hill

Bedwell

Chells

Longmeadow

Manor

Martins Wood

Old Town

Pin Green

Roebuck

Shephall

St Nicholas

Symonds Green

Woodfield

References

2021
Stevenage
May 2021 events in the United Kingdom
2020s in Hertfordshire